Bardstown (1952–1972) was an American Thoroughbred racehorse.

Background
He was bred and raced by Calumet Farm of Lexington, Kentucky who named him for the city of Bardstown in Nelson County, Kentucky. Due to ankle and hip joint problems, Bardstown, a gelding, did not race until age four but then competed for four years and became one of the top older horses of his time.

Racing career
Trained by "Jimmy" Jones, among his important wins Bardstown twice won Florida's Tropical Handicap at Tropical Park Race Track as well as the premier event on the winter racing calendar, the  Widener Handicap at Hialeah Park Race Track in Hialeah, Florida. At age seven, Bardstown set a new Tropical Park track record of 1:40 2/5 for a mile and one sixteenth on dirt while winning the 1959 Orange Bowl Handicap.

Retirement
Bardstown was retired to Calumet Farm in 1960 where he died in 1972.

Pedigree

References

1952 racehorse births
1972 racehorse deaths
Thoroughbred family 23-b
Racehorses bred in Kentucky
Racehorses trained in the United States